Shaadi Mein Zaroor Aana is a 2017 Indian Hindi-language romance-drama comedy film directed by Ratnaa Sinha. The film features Rajkummar Rao and Kriti Kharbanda in lead roles, while K. K. Raina, Alka Amin, Vipin Sharma, Govind Namdev, Navni Parihar, Nayani Dixit, Manoj Pahwa featured in supporting roles. The story revolves around two individuals viz. Satyendra Mishra IAS and Aarti Shukla and relates their journey from how they are brought together by a marriage proposal and fall in love with each other but on the night of their marriage, destiny, and individual decisions, takes the two of them in two different directions.

It had a worldwide release on 10 November 2017 with a mixed response from the critics. Its music was composed by Anand Raj Anand, JAM8, and Arko with lyrics written by Kumaar.

Plot 
Aarti Shukla, an emotionally unstable but otherwise intelligent girl, meets Satyendra Mishra, a clerk in the Excise Department, on her parents' persistence who are trying to fix an arranged marriage for her. Aarti finds Satyendra's off-traditional views convenient, while Satyendra is mesmerized by Aarti's beauty and intelligence and as a consequence both of them fall in love with each other and agree to marry. On the night of marriage, Aarti learns that she has cleared the PCS Exam from her sister Abha, who also informs her that if she marries now her in-laws will not let her pursue the dreams that she has. On her sister's and maternal uncle's provocation Aarti decides to run-away from her house without informing Satyendra or his family, who is surprised by the incident and is left heartbroken. Later her uncle manipulates Satyendra's family to return dowry money some of which they had spent on marriage already and saved remaining for Satyendra's sister's wedding. Due to this, his family goes through a painful time in society. Five years later, Aarti who is now a PCS Officer is accused of taking a bribe and suspended till her case is resolved. During the investigation Aarti discovers that the officer in charge of her case is none other than Satyendra, who has now become an IAS Officer and who is the District Collector. Aarti discovers that Satyendra has no sympathy for her at all.

Aarti approaches Satyendra for assistance but is shunned away by and also insults her and her family members. The investigation is completed and Aarti is proven innocent. It is later revealed that it was actually Satyendra who helped in the investigation to prove Aarti's innocence.

Aarti later tries her best to make amends with Satyendra but to no avail. A few months later, Aarti is shown marrying someone and Satyendra's family is also invited. On the day of the wedding, Satyendra realizes his love for Aarti and gate-crashes into her wedding, holding her fiancé, Sharad, at gunpoint with his own personal firearm. It is revealed that the wedding was only a drama planned by both the families to make Satyendra realize his true feelings. The movie ends with Aarti and Satyendra getting married.

Cast 

 Rajkummar Rao as Satyendra "Sattu" Mishra IAS, District Collector, an honest and upright officer, former excise official
 Kriti Kharbanda as PCS Officer Aarti Shukla, suspended on charges of bribery and corruption
 Navni Parihar as Manju Shukla, Aarti's mother
 Govind Namdev as Shyam Sunder "S. S." Shukla, Aarti's father
 Nayani Dixit as Aabha Shukla, Sharad's wife and Aarti's sister
 Manoj Pahwa as Jogi Sinha, Aarti and Aabha's maternal uncle
 K. K. Raina as Professor Jugal Kishore "J. K." Mishra, Satyendra's father)
 Alka Amin as Shanti Mishra, Satyendra's mother
 Vipin Sharma as Mahesh Kumar, Satyendra's maternal uncle
 Abhijeet Singh as Ranjan Sinha, Jogi's son and Aarti and Aabha's cousin brother
 Neha D. Bhriguvanshi as Neelam Gupta, Aarti's friend and colleague
 Ashish Kapoor as Builder Mr. Kukreja
 Mahesh Chandra Deva as Rajesh Yadav Landbroker
 Rakesh Dubey as Satyendra's PSO
 Sanath Gaur as Mahesh's uncle
 Karanvir Sharma as Sharad Shukla, Aabha's husband and Aarti's brother-in-law
 Ashok Kumar as Satyendra's official bungalow servant and best friend 
 Ajitesh Gupta as Priyansh Yadav Satyendra's best friend's friend 
 Vivek Yadav as Biker Boy

Production

Development 

In February 2017, producer Vinod Bachchan made the official announcement about his film Shaadi Mein Zaroor Aana with Rajkummar Rao and Kriti Kharbanda in lead roles. For the role of Aarti Shukla, the first choice of filmmaker Ratna Sinha was Taapsee Pannu who had reportedly came on board to do the film but later on decided against doing so citing lack of dates. She was replaced by Kriti Kharbanda.

Filming 
The principal photography of Shaadi Mein Zaroor Aana began in March 2017 in Allahabad. The scenes that were included in the movie was that of Hanuman Mandir in Civil Lines, Allahabad, the Lord Curzon Bridge near Naini and beautiful sights of the Triveni Sangam side. Following which there was a 30-day schedule in Lucknow while the final schedule of the film took place in Kanpur. Some famous scenes of Lucknow include the Ambedkar Memorial Park. A set worth 20 million was created in Lucknow by art director Arup Adhikari, set designer Shabiul Haasan and their team to film a wedding sequence that formed the climax of the film.

Soundtrack 

The soundtrack album of Shaadi Mein Zaroor Aana comprises eleven songs composed by Arko Pravo Mukherjee, Kaushik-Akash-Guddu (KAG) For JAM8, Zain-Sam-Raees, Anand Raaj Anand and Rashid Khan while the lyrics were written by Kumaar, Shakeel Azmi, Gaurav Krishna Bansal, Arko and Kunal Verma. Vocals on the album's eight tracks were performed by several singers mainly Yasser Desai, Arijit Singh, and Shafqat Amanat Ali. It was produced under the Zee Music label.

The song "Pallo Latke" is a remake of a popular Rajasthani folk song.

Bollywood Hungama gave 3 out of 5 stars and noted in its music review that, "What works for the music of Shaadi Mein Zaroor Aana is the fact that there is a constant 'sur' right through its playing time which doesn't cause a distraction. The sound is uniform and helps the album to play on well through its duration." Vipin Nair of The Hindu in his review said that the soundtrack is "entirely missable" and gave it a rating of 2.5/5.

Reception

Box office 
Shaadi Mein Zaroor Aana premiered on 10 November 2017 across India.

Critical response 
Namrata Joshi of The Hindu was impressed with the acting performances of all actors but criticized the implausible revenge story that the film becomes in its second half. Urvi Parikh of Rediff was critical of the weak storyline of the film and its slow pacing. The critic gave the film a rating of 1.5 out of 5. Bollywood Hungama praised the concept of the film but criticized its uninspired execution and gave the film a rating of 2 out of 5. The website appreciated the acting performance of Rajkummar Rao but was critical of the writers for their confused presentation of his character.

Kriti Tulsiani of News18 praised the acting performances of all actors but criticized the poorly written script which she felt was not just unreasonable but also out-dated. Kriti gave the film a rating of 2 out of 5. Rachit Gupta of Filmfare applauded the makers for taking up issues that are very relevant to our society but was critical of the way they were handled. Rachit felt that the film suffers a lot from the usage of outdated clichés and too much melodrama and gave it a rating of 2.5 out of 5. Meena Iyer of DNA India praised the acting performance of Rajkummar Rao but felt that the film lacked conviction and could not tap its entire potential. Meena gave the film a rating of 2.5 out of 5.

Awards and nominations

References

External links 
 
Watch Shaadi Mein Zaroor Aana on ZEE5

2010s Hindi-language films
2017 romantic drama films
Indian romantic drama films
Films about Indian weddings
Films shot in Uttar Pradesh
Films shot in Lucknow
Films shot in Kanpur
Films set in Lucknow
Films set in Kanpur
Films set in Uttar Pradesh
Civil Services of India